The Harrington Park School District is a community public school district that serves students in pre-kindergarten through eighth grade from Harrington Park, in Bergen County, New Jersey, United States.

As of the 2021–22 school year, the district, comprised of one school, had an enrollment of 644 students and 56.9 classroom teachers (on an FTE basis), for a student–teacher ratio of 11.3:1.

The district is classified by the New Jersey Department of Education as being in District Factor Group "I", the second-highest of eight groupings. District Factor Groups organize districts statewide to allow comparison by common socioeconomic characteristics of the local districts. From lowest socioeconomic status to highest, the categories are A, B, CD, DE, FG, GH, I and J.

Students in public school for ninth through twelfth grades attend Northern Valley Regional High School at Old Tappan, together with students from Harrington Park, Northvale, Norwood and Old Tappan along with students from Rockleigh who attend the high school as part of a sending/receiving relationship. It is one of the two schools of the Northern Valley Regional High School District, which also serves students from the neighboring communities of Closter, Demarest and Haworth at the Northern Valley Regional High School at Demarest. During the 1994-96 school years, Northern Valley Regional High School at Old Tappan was awarded the Blue Ribbon School Award of Excellence by the United States Department of Education. As of the 2021–22 school year, the high school had an enrollment of 1,044 students and 104.0 classroom teachers (on an FTE basis), for a student–teacher ratio of 10.0:1.

The district participates in special education programs offered by Region III, one of seven such regional programs in Bergen County. Region III coordinates and develops special education programs for the 1,000 students with learning disabilities in the region, which also includes the Alpine, Closter, Demarest, Haworth, Northvale, Norwood and Old Tappan districts, as well as the Northern Valley Regional High School District.

School
Harrington Park School serves students in grades PreK-8. The school had an enrollment of 616 students as of the 2020–21 school year.
Jessica Nitzberg, Principal

Administration
Core members of the district's administration are:
Dr. Adam D. Fried, Superintendent
Bryan Jursca, Business Administrator / Board Secretary

Board of education
The district's board of education, comprised of five members, sets policy and oversees the fiscal and educational operation of the district through its administration. As a Type II school district, the board's trustees are elected directly by voters to serve three-year terms of office on a staggered basis, with either one or two seats up for election each year held (since 2014) as part of the November general election. The board appoints a superintendent to oversee the district's day-to-day operations and a business administrator to supervise the business functions of the district.

References

External links

Data for Harrington Park School District, National Center for Education Statistics
Northern Valley Regional High School District

Harrington Park, New Jersey
New Jersey District Factor Group I
School districts in Bergen County, New Jersey